The Definition of X: The Pick of the Litter is a compilation album by American rapper DMX. It was released on June 12, 2007 via Def Jam Recordings. Production was handled by Swizz Beatz, Dame Grease, P. Killer Trackz, Black Key, DJ Shok, DJ Scratch, Irv Gotti, Nokio, Self, Shatek King and Tuneheadz. It features guest appearances from The Lox, Drag-On, Jay-Z, Sisqó and Swizz Beatz.

In the United States, the album debuted at number 26 on the Billboard 200, number 7 on the Top R&B/Hip-Hop Albums and number 3 on the Top Rap Albums, selling about 35,000 copies in its first week. It received a Silver certification by British Phonographic Industry on April 3, 2020 for selling 60,000 units in the UK.

Although the album has both an explicit version and an edited version, on the explicit version on the track "Where the Hood At" some lines are still edited. The track "Slippin" is also the edited version. Also "Prayer III" is actually "Prayer II" from Flesh of My Flesh, Blood of My Blood.

Track listing

Sample credits

Track 3 contains samples from "Everything Good to You" written by Sam Taylor and performed by B. T. Express
Track 4 contains samples from "My Hero Is a Gun" written by Michael Masser and performed by The Temptations
Track 9 contains samples from "Young Gifted & Black" written and performed by Antonio "Big Daddy Kane" Hardy
Track 12 contains samples from "Heartbeat" written and performed by Taana Gardner
Track 14 contains samples from "Will She Meet the Train in the Rain" written by Leonard Perry, Katie Davis and Mallory Cowart, and performed by Greg Perry
Track 19 contains samples from "Moonstream" written and performed by Grover Washington Jr.

Notes
Tracks 1, 7, 12, 16 and 19 are from Flesh of My Flesh, Blood of My Blood © 1998
Track 1 is originally titled as "Prayer II: Ready to Meet Him"
Tracks 2, 3, 4, 5 and 20 are from It's Dark and Hell Is Hot © 1998
Tracks 6, 8, 10, 15 and 18 are from ... And Then There Was X © 1999
Track 6 is listed as "What You Want" on the clean version of the album
Tracks 9 and 14 are from Grand Champ © 2003
Track 11 is from Cradle 2 the Grave © 2003
Tracks 13 and 17 are from The Great Depression © 2001

Personnel

Earl "DMX" Simmons – performer
Sean "Sheek Louch" Jacobs – performer (tracks: 3, 7)
Lovey Ford – backing vocals (track 5)
Schamika Grant – backing vocals (track 5)
Mark "Sisqó" Andrews – performer (track 6)
Shawn "Jay-Z" Carter – performer (track 7)
David "Styles P" Styles – performer (track 7)
Jason "Jadakiss" Phillips – performer (track 7)
Dustin Adams – additional vocals (track 13)
Melvin "Drag-On" Smalls – performer (track 16)
Kaseem "Swizz Beatz" Dean – performer (track 16), producer (tracks: 2, 7, 10, 12, 16, 18)
Tamyra Gray – additional vocals (track 19)
Cliff Branch – keyboards (track 5)
Kenya Miller – programming (track 6)
Damon "Dame Grease" Blackman – producer (tracks: 3, 20), additional producer (track 4)
Anthony "P. Killer Trackz" Fields – producer (tracks: 4, 5), additional producer (track 3)
Tamir "Nokio" Ruffin – producer (track 6)
Edward "Self" Hinson – producer (track 8)
Irving "Irv Gotti" Lorenzo – producer (track 8)
Eriberio Serrano – producer (track 9)
Shatek King – producer (track 11)
Michael "Black Key" Davis – producer (tracks: 13, 17)
George "DJ Scratch" Spivey – producer (track 14)
Michael "DJ Shok" Gomez – producer (tracks: 15, 19)
Melvin "Hip" Armstead – co-producer (track 13)
Justice Johnson – recording (track 2)
Richard Keller – mixing (tracks: 2, 5, 9-12, 15-20), recording (tracks: 7, 12, 16, 19)
D'Anthony Johnson – recording (tracks: 3, 4), mixing (track 3)
Ken "Duro" Ifill – mixing (tracks: 4, 7, 8)
"Prince" Charles Alexander – recording (track 5)
Tony Smalios – mixing (track 6)
Adam Gazzola – recording (tracks: 7, 12, 16, 19), mixing (track 19)
Dragan Čačinović – recording & mixing (tracks: 9, 14)
Chris Theis – recording (tracks: 10, 11, 15, 18)
Jaime Weddle – recording (tracks: 13, 17)
Otto D'Agnolo – recording (tracks: 13, 17)
Brian Stanley – mixing (track 13)
Tony Dawsey – mastering
Dawud West – art direction, design
Jonathan Mannion – photography
Mark Mann – photography
Tara Podolsky – A&R
Leesa D. Brunson – A&R
Antoinette Trotman – management
Ian Allen – management
Nicole Wyskoarko – management
Rob Caiaffa – marketing
Andy Proctor – package production manager

Charts

Certifications

References

External links

DMX (rapper) albums
2007 greatest hits albums
Albums produced by Irv Gotti
Albums produced by DJ Scratch
Albums produced by Dame Grease
Albums produced by Swizz Beatz
Ruff Ryders Entertainment compilation albums
Def Jam Recordings compilation albums